Hailu Mergia is an Ethiopian keyboardist, now based in Washington D.C., United States. He is best known for his role in the Walias Band in the 1970s, one of the most significant groups in Ethiopia’s "golden age" of music.

Biography 
Hailu Mergia was born in 1946 in the Shewa Province of the Ethiopian Empire and moved to Addis Ababa at age 10. He had grown up on traditional Oromo, Amhara and Tigrinya songbook melodies, and taught himself the accordion at age 14. His mastering of the accordion, as well as the keyboard and his talent for "re-purposing folk songs into funkier modern melodies," defined his contribution to popular music in Ethiopia. In the 1970s, Hailu Mergia was the keyboardist in the Walias Band, a jazz and funk band with a hard polyrhythmic funk sound influenced by western artists like King Curtis, Junior Walker and Maceo Parker. In the period, it was harder for working bands in the region to make a living, after Mengistu's Derg government imposed breaks to Addis Ababa's nightlife, but music was still being regularly recorded, and cassettes were the typical release format, given they were easy to duplicate and distribute. Walias Band had a 10-year residency at Addis's Hilton hotel in this period.

Due to the Derg dictatorship, censorship was often a problem for the area's musicians, but Hailu acknowledged one way around censorship was to only create instrumentals. He later noted: "When you sing or write lyrics you have to support the government, and if you don't do that then you have a problem." Ethiopian music was typically led by a vocalist: just three instrumental albums were released during Addis’ 'golden age' of music, including one of Hailu's landmark albums with the Walias Band, Tche Belew (1977). As a side project, Hailu joined the Dhalak Band around this period and recorded the cassette-only Wede Harer Guzo (1978) with them, a jazz-infused album with a dominance of improvisation. Hailu's organ work for the band was one of the Walias Band's key characteristics, but during a 1980s tour of the United States, Hailu and several other members decided to stay in the US, effectively ending the band's career, although their legacy in Ethiopia was strong by this point, especially via their 1977 instrumental "Muziqawi Silt."

It was only several years after moving to the US that Hailu recorded a new album, Hailu Mergia & His Classical Instrument, in 1985, during which point he was playing with the Zula Band. Hailu recorded the album alone in a small studio belonging to an acquaintance that Hailu met at Howard University, where he had begun studying music.

He stopped performing in 1991 and opened a restaurant. Since 1998 Hailu has worked as a taxi driver, mostly based around Washington DC's Dulles Airport. However, he continues to write music in his spare time: “After I drop my customer, I grab my keyboard from the trunk and sit in the car and practice.”

Hailu Mergia & His Classical Instrument was re-released in 2013 on the Awesome Tapes From Africa label, after the label’s owner discovered the album in a cassette bin. Two years later, his first new record in over two decades, Lala Belu, was released on the same label, with Hailu accompanied by Mike Majkowski and Tony Buck. This was followed in 2020 by a full-band album, Yene Mircha.

References 

Living people
Ethiopian composers
Ethiopian emigrants to the United States
Ethiopian music arrangers
Ethiopian taxi drivers
People from Addis Ababa
Musicians from Washington, D.C.
Year of birth missing (living people)